Conistone with Kilnsey is a civil parish in Wharfedale in the district of Craven, North Yorkshire, England. It contains the villages of Kilnsey and Conistone. The population of this civil parish at the 2011 Census was 124 with an estimated population of 110 in 2015.

History 
Conistone with Kilnsey was formerly a township in the parish of Burnsall, in 1866 Conistone with Kilnsey became a civil parish in its own right.

References

Civil parishes in North Yorkshire
Wharfedale
Craven District